Albert Hornby is the name of:

A. H. Hornby (1877–1952), English cricketer, son of A. N. Hornby
A. N. Hornby (1847–1925), English rugby and cricket captain
A. S. Hornby (1898–1978), English grammarian, lexicographer and researcher into second language teaching